David Borrelli (born January 14, 1981) is a Canadian-born Italian ice hockey player. He is currently playing with the HC Asiago of the Italian Elite.A.

International
Borrelli was named to the Italy national ice hockey team for competition at the 2014 IIHF World Championship.

Career statistics

References

External links

1981 births
Living people
Cincinnati Cyclones (ECHL) players
Fresno Falcons players
Asiago Hockey 1935 players
Ice hockey people from Ontario
Italian ice hockey left wingers
Mercyhurst Lakers men's ice hockey players
Reading Royals players
Sportspeople from Sault Ste. Marie, Ontario